John Kennedy Tod (11 September 1852 – 2 June 1925) was a Scottish-American merchant banker. In his youth he was a Scottish rugby union international who represented Scotland in the 1873–74 Home Nations rugby union matches and 1874–75 Home Nations rugby union matches. Tod was born on 11 September 1852 in Glasgow, Scotland and later moved to America where he attended Princeton University.

Rugby Union career

Amateur career

He played as a forward for Glasgow Academicals.

Provincial career

He represented Glasgow District against Edinburgh District in the world's first provincial match, the 'inter-city', on 23 November 1872.

He also represented Glasgow District against Edinburgh District in the 5 December 1874 match.

He also represented the West of Scotland District.

International career

He played in both Home Nations matches in the 1874-75 seasons against England; home and away. His debut was the away match on 23 February 1874 at The Oval. His only subsequent cap for Scotland was in the home match on 8 March 1875.

Business career

Tod moved to New York and became a banking partner of his uncle John Stewart Kennedy on Wall Street.  Tod formed the banking firm of J. Kennedy Tod & Co., of No. 45 Wall Street.

From 1890 to 1897, he took an active part in the reorganization of the railway properties during the disastrous years and was particularly interested in the successful readjustment of the affairs of the Philadelphia and Reading Railway, Norfolk & Western Railroad, St. Louis & San Francisco Railway, San Antonio and Aransas Pass Railway, Minneapolis and St. Louis Railway, Rio Grande Western Railway, Toledo, St. Louis and Western Railroad, Colorado & Southern Railway, Memphis & Charleston Railroad and Baltimore & Ohio Railroad.

He also served as Chairman of the Board of Trustees of the Caledonian Insurance Company of Edinburgh; a trustee of the Central Trust Company; the Norwich Union Fire Insurance Company, the Provident Loan Society of New York, and a director of the American Cotton Oil Company, the Bank of New York, and the Indemnity Fire Insurance Company as well as a director of several railroads, insurance companies and banks.

Personal life

He married Mary Howard Potter, the daughter of Howard Potter (an industrialist, investment banker, diplomat and philanthropist) and his wife, Mary Louisa (née Brown) Potter (of the Brown Bros. & Co. family). The Tods had no children.

He was a member of many clubs including the Knickerbocker Club, Metropolitan Club, Lawyers Club, City Club, Downtown Club, Tuxedo Club, the Century Association, the New York Chamber of Commerce, the Seawanhaka Corinthian Yacht Club, the Indian Harbor Yacht Club, the Riverside Yacht Club, the Fairfield County Golf Club (original name of the Greenwich Country Club), and the Social Register of New York.  His country estate, known as Innis Arden in Old Greenwich is today a public park called Greenwich Point. Like his uncle, he was president of the Saint Andrew's Society of the State of New York.

Tod died on 2 June 1925 at his summer home in Old Greenwich, Connecticut (previously known as Sound Beach).

References

External links

1852 births
1925 deaths
Scottish rugby union players
Scotland international rugby union players
Rugby union forwards
Glasgow District (rugby union) players
Glasgow Academicals rugby union players
Presidents of the Saint Andrew's Society of the State of New York
Rugby union players from Glasgow
Scottish emigrants to the United States
West of Scotland District (rugby union) players